Redemption at the Puritan's Hand is the seventh studio album by the Irish pagan metal band Primordial, recorded at Foel Studio, Wales, with producer Chris Fielding and released on April 26, 2011.  The album charted in Finland (#23), Germany (#31), Sweden (#54) and Switzerland (#90).

Theme
When asked to describe the album, vocalist A.A. Nemtheanga remarked "this is the 'death' album. Plain and simple."  Averill explained that, while Redemption At The Puritan's Hand is not a concept album, "many of the themes deal with mortality [and] how we deal with it. The spiritual structures we place around us to make sense of it. Sex, death, procreation and god. As we get older our relationship to our lives changes, the realization you will not live forever, the grand plan you hoped to uncover never materializes, food for worms and nothing more."

Averill used this theme to mount a critique of religious belief, and particularly the notion of spiritual redemption:

Track listing

Credits
 A.A. Nemtheanga – Vocals
 Ciáran MacUiliam – Guitars
 Michael Ó Floinn – Guitars
 Pól MacAmlaigh – Bass
 Simon Ó Laoghaire – Drums

References 

2011 albums
Primordial (band) albums
Metal Blade Records albums